Myrcianthes coquimbensis, commonly called lucumillo, is an evergreen shrub of the genus Myrcianthes of the family Myrtaceae. It is endemic to the Coquimbo Region of Chile and is considered to be endangered. Produces an edible fruit.

Description
Myrcianthes coquimbensis is a small rounded, aromatic, dense shrub growing to a height of about 1.5 metres (5 feet). The leaves are short-stalked, evergreen, oval or elliptical, with entire margins that are often downrolled. The lateral veins are nearly perpendicular to the central vein. The small flowers either grow singly or in groups of three, the central one being sessile and the side ones having short stalks. The five petals are white and there is a boss of protruding stamens. The fruit is a edible fleshy berry containing one or two seeds and is topped by the remains of the five persistent sepals.

Distribution and habitat
Myrcianthes coquimbensis is endemic to Chile. Its range extends for about  along the coast of the Elqui Province in the Chilean region of Coquimbo. It  typically  grows on coastal rocks located on slopes that are almost constantly moist with mists blown in from the Pacific Ocean, although some plants grow in other locations. This species is often associated with a community of other plants and shrubs including Bridgesia incisifolia, Oxalis gigantea, Heliotropium stenophyllum, Bahia ambrosioides and Polyachyrus poeppigii. The conservation status of this shrub is considered to be "endangered" because of habitat loss, failure of the shrub to flower and fruit, and consequent lack of recruitment of young plants.

See also
Myrceugenia obtusa 
Pouteria splendens
Eugenia calycina

References

Endemic flora of Chile
Trees of Chile
coquimbensis